Dorcadion neilense is a species of beetle in the family Cerambycidae. It was described by Escalera in 1902. It is known from Spain.

See also 
Dorcadion

References

neilense
Beetles described in 1902